Costa Rica is an active member of the international community and, in 1983, claimed it was for neutrality. Due to certain powerful constituencies favoring its methods, it has a weight in world affairs far beyond its size. The country lobbied aggressively for the establishment of the Office of the United Nations High Commissioner for Human Rights and became the first nation to recognize the jurisdiction of the Inter-American Human Rights Court, based in San José.

The foreign affairs of the Republic of Costa Rica are a function of the Ministry of Foreign Affairs and Worship.

History 
Costa Rica gained election as president of the Group of 77 in the United Nations in 1995. That term ended in 1997 with the South-South Conference held in San Jose.

Costa Rica occupied a nonpermanent seat in the Security Council from 1997 to 1999 and exercised a leadership role in confronting crises in the Middle East and Africa, as well as in the former Socialist Federal Republic of Yugoslavia. It is currently a member of the United Nations Commission on Human Rights. On Jan 1 2008 Costa Rica started its third year term on the Security Council.

Costa Rica strongly backed efforts by the United States to implement UN Security Council Resolution 940, which led to the restoration of the democratically elected Government of Haiti in October 1994. Costa Rica was among the first to call for a postponement of the May 22 elections in Peru when international observer missions found electoral machinery not prepared for the vote count.

Costa Rica is also a member of the International Criminal Court, without a Bilateral Immunity Agreement of protection for the US-military (as covered under Article 98).

Costa Rica's relation to Central America

In 1987, then President Óscar Arias authored a regional plan that served as the basis for the Esquipulas Peace Agreement and Arias was awarded the 1987 Nobel Peace Prize for his work. Arias also promoted change in the USSR-backed Nicaraguan government of the era. Costa Rica also hosted several rounds of negotiations between the Salvadoran Government and the Farabundo Martí National Liberation Front, aiding El Salvador's efforts to emerge from civil war and culminating in that country's 1994 free and fair elections. Costa Rica has been a strong proponent of regional arms-limitation agreements. Former President Miguel Ángel Rodríguez recently proposed the abolition of all Central American militaries and the creation of a regional counternarcotics police force in their stead.

With the establishment of democratically elected governments in all Central American nations by the 1990s, Costa Rica turned its focus from regional conflicts to the pursuit of neoliberal policies on the isthmus. The influence of these policies, along with the US invasion of Panama, was instrumental in drawing Panama into the Central American model of neoliberalism. Costa Rica also participated in the multinational Partnership for Democracy and Development in Central America.

Regional political integration has not proven attractive to Costa Rica. The country debated its role in the Central American integration process under former President Calderon. Costa Rica has sought concrete economic ties with its Central American neighbors rather than the establishment of regional political institutions, and it chose not to join the Central American Parliament.

Costa Rica in the UN

Costa Rica has been an active member of the United Nations since its inception at the San Francisco Conference in 1945. Its first ambassador to the United Nations was Fernando Soto Harrison, the secretary of governance under President Picado.

Costa Rican Christiana Figueres was nominated for the post of UN secretary-general in July 2016.

Bilateral relations

See also
 List of diplomatic missions in Costa Rica
 List of diplomatic missions of Costa Rica
 Visa requirements for Costa Rican citizens

Sources

http://www.boston.com/news/world/asia/articles/2007/06/07/costa_rica_switches_allegiance_to_china_from_taiwan/
http://www.mea.gov.in/Portal/ForeignRelation/Costa_Rica-India_Bilateral-Jan_2013.pdf